Fabio Fognini was the defending champion, but chose not to play.
Carlos Berlocq won the final against Daniel Gimeno-Traver 6–3, 4–6, 6–4.

Seeds

Draw

Finals

Top half

Bottom half

References
Main Draw
Qualifying Singles

Carisap Tennis Cup - Singles
ATP Challenger San Benedetto